Ernest Harmon Air Force Base is a former United States Air Force base located in Stephenville, Newfoundland and Labrador. The base was built by the United States Army Air Forces in 1941 under the Destroyers for Bases Agreement with the United Kingdom.

From its establishment in 1941 until March 31, 1949, the base was located in the Dominion of Newfoundland. On March 31, 1949, the Dominion of Newfoundland was admitted to Canadian Confederation and became the 10th province of Canada. The agreement enabling the base's existence, from 1941 until closure in 1966, enabled it to function as a de facto enclave of United States territory within, first the Dominion of Newfoundland and later Canada, making United States military personnel stationed at the base subject to the Uniform Code of Military Justice.

Following its closure in 1966, the base property was relinquished by the Government of the United States to the Government of Canada, under the terms of the original deal. The Government of Canada subsequently transferred the base property to the Government of Newfoundland and Labrador, which established the Harmon Corporation to oversee the disposition and use of the base property and facilities.

The airfield is now operated as Stephenville International Airport while many of the base's support buildings and housing have been incorporated into the town of Stephenville.

Construction and operation
During 1940, Germany was threatening the majority of Europe, as well as North America, through its successful air, land and sea campaigns. The destructiveness of the Luftwaffe (air force) and Kriegsmarine (navy) in the Battle of Britain and Battle of the Atlantic alarmed military planners in the United States who theorized that the Nazis could in future establish a beachhead on Newfoundland and the adjacent French islands of Saint Pierre and Miquelon and use it for launching air attacks and eventually land and sea attacks on the industrial heartland of North America.

In 1940, the United States entered into the Destroyers for Bases deal with the government of the United Kingdom, allowing the US military to establish facilities in British Overseas Territories in the Western Hemisphere. The primary focus for North American defence from Nazi aggression was Newfoundland, which the United States sought to arm as a geographic buffer much as it was doing with its Alaska territory to defend North America against Imperial Japan in the northwest.

The United States established an administrative army air force and coast defense base named Fort Pepperrell in St. John's, along with a deepwater naval base and naval aviation field at Argentia on the Avalon Peninsula. The 76th Congress approved the 99-year lease and in April 1941, construction began on a deepwater port and adjacent air field.

During the war a battery of two 155 mm coast defense guns was at the base, due to its coastal location. It was called Battery T8503 and was operated by Coast Artillery Corps troops of the Harbor Defenses of Argentia and St. John's.

The air force base was originally referred to as Stephenville Air Base. On September 1, 1943, the Newfoundland Base Command transferred control of the Stephenville Air Base to the North Atlantic Wing, Air Transport Command. The base was actively used throughout the war and was one of the largest U.S. military airfields located outside of the continental United States; it was capable of landing the largest cargo aircraft in the world at that time and the base became a frequent stopping and refueling point for USAAF aircraft crossing the Atlantic. Stephenville Air Base was renamed "Ernest Harmon Air Force Base" on June 23, 1948, in honor of Captain Ernest Emery Harmon. Capt Harmon was a U.S. Army Air Corps pilot who was killed in an air crash in 1933. The deepwater port which supported the base was named Port Harmon at this time.

Ernest Harmon AFB was transferred to Northeast Air Command in October 1950. The 6605th Air Base Wing served as the host unit at the base. In April 1957, with the rising threat of nuclear war, the Strategic Air Command (SAC) assumed control of the base for use as a forward refuelling point. The 6605th Wing was superseded by the 4081st Strategic Wing. Ernest Harmon AFB became home to a fleet of KC-97 Stratofreighter air refueling aircraft, which were kept on alert in order to meet and refuel nuclear armed B-52 Stratofortress bombers in the skies over western Newfoundland. The base also saw use as a refueling stop for transatlantic military flights and the base supported three Aerospace Defense Command (ADC) units. In 1957, the Canadian Department of Transport constructed an airport terminal to accommodate Trans-Canada Air Lines (now Air Canada) commercial flights; Ernest Harmon AFB being the only air field in western Newfoundland.

Aerodrome

The field was listed as "all hard surfaced" and had three runways listed as follows:

Cold War expansion and road construction

The Cold War expansion of the base in the early 1950s coincided with the Korean War and the rise in nuclear tensions with the Soviet Union. The USAF sought to build more roads in the area to serve the base and nearby Pinetree Line early warning radar site and to patrol the immediate area for security; the roads would also act as a means of dispersing personnel in an emergency. One of the more important projects was a bypass road around the base, known as the Hansen Memorial Highway.

In 1953, the 347th (Engineer Aviation) battalion was assigned the immense task (along with 2,502 contractor personnel) of completing the 62 line construction projects at Ernest Harmon AFB. These consisted of:
 completion of major runways of up to 
 taxiway and aprons of up to 
 aprons of heavy duty pavement up to 
 construct a runway complex that was so large that the existing harbor facilities at Port Harmon had to be demolished to give proper clearance for aircraft
 construction of fighter aircraft hangars
 construction of a flight control tower in September 1953

By June 1953 the 347th Engineers had deployed 444 engineers. They were joined by an additional 750 engineers who departed Florida and arrived at Harmon on June 23 to construct three of the line construction projects:
 a bypass road Hanson Memorial Highway to prevent civilian access through the base (in progress since April, 1943)
 a base salvage yard
 a trailer park for Harmon personnel
 removal of a granite hill the north end of the Frobisher Bay AFB runway

The 347th Engineers was made up of four companies; three line companies and one Headquarters and Service (H&S) company. Company A was responsible for construction of the salvage yard and Company B and C were responsible for the construction of the bypass road with a budget of $583,000.

Thirty Butler Buildings (prefabricated steel) were located on the property. The machinery which constructed the bypass road was buried at the end of the property when it became over used and obsolete in 1959–1960, under the supervision of Warrant Officer Ebb Higdon, Company A. They were later dug up to be sold for scrap but were found to be useless and reburied. This equipment had come up from Florida in Liberty ships, with the battalion in 1953. In 1986, when this information was made available to the town of Stephenville via a series of articles in the Georgian newspaper, several doubters and curiosity seekers, armed with metal detectors, swarmed over the site and located the buried equipment.

Company B and C began work on the bypass road by working towards each other. Company C, under the command of Captain Claxton Ray began at the Stephenville side and worked towards Company B which began construction near Cormiers Village and worked in two directions towards Long Gull Pond and towards Stephenville. It was necessary to begin construction of the road at Cormiers Village and work back towards Stephenville pending the finalizing of property agreements. Company B was under the command of Captain Gomez. The H&S Company split operations equipment and men between the three Companies.

The road followed the existing rail road line. These roads were built to the same specifications as the bypass road as they were used constantly for heavy hauling. The concrete bridge over Cold Creek was built in 1954 and the  concrete bridge over Warm Creek was programmed for completion in 1956. Equipment and material were stored at the Gull Pond site. The bypass road was officially opened to the public in October 1957 and named the Hanson Memorial Highway. The third construction operation was cancelled.

The 347th (changed to the 823rd in 1954) Engineer Aviation Battalion was disbanded in 1957 and most of the men went back to the US. The two battalion commanders at the time were, Colonel Germain and Major Truet. The medical officer was V.H. Berry and the ground safety officer was 1st Lieutenant Arthur Everitt. The general construction on the base (buildings, roads and runways) was done under the base supervision of Colonel Koski and Colonel Bailey. J.A. Jones held the construction contract from 1954 to 1959. From 1956 to 1959, Major Ray was the superintendent for the asphalt, rock crushing and concrete operations for J.A. Jones and was responsible for the construction of 200 on base houses, two seven-story barracks for 1,500 airmen, additional runways and the Central Heating (steam) Plant. Colonel Koski died in 1989 and Lieutenant Colonel Ray died on New Year's Eve, 1989. One of the barracks is now used as residences for the College of the North Atlantic as well as a hotel during the summer tourist season. The other barrack was converted into a six-story apartment complex known as the Stephenville Manor.

Base facilities

Base schools
The first educational institution in the Bay St. George area was established by the Roman Catholic Church. Bishop John T. Mullock established the first church at Sandy Point in 1848 when the population of the area numbered approximately 2,000. Local priest Father Sears established a church in the coastal community of Stephenville and by 1884 there were four Catholic schools in the parish. One at Sandy Point, one at the Highlands, one at Port aux Basques and one at Campbell's Creek.

Protestant schools were subsequently established in the St. George's Bay area as settlements grew. Newfoundland and Labrador maintained their separate denominational schools until the late 1990s. The huge influx of US military personnel and their families to the region required separate schools and a curriculum approved by the US Air Force. Such cultural and institutional changes were revolutionary for Newfoundland at that time, however the development of education facilities would take many years.

The first educational institution at Ernest Harmon AFB was an elementary school established in 1948 using a small clap-board building that housed 28 children and 3 teachers. The first high school graduating class (1957) matriculated in 1953 with all of the students beginning their educations at St. Stephens High School in Stephenville. A new elementary school was built near the base entrance in 1955 and was formally opened in May 1956 by former base commander, Colonel Richard Fellows and the school principal, Mr. Gerald Brennan. In 1956 there were 19 teachers and 62 children.

On September 4, 1956, the base high school officially opened in building number T-394, the old elementary school building. In 1958, the same year that Stephenville received its first traffic light and television celebrated its first birthday, Harmon High established its own newspaper, The Harmon Highlight. In June 1960 the elementary school was located to a building with large play areas for the children. There were 29 elementary teachers and Mrs. Anna Barnett was the secretary. Joseph C. McCormack was the high school principal in 1961 and Mr. Harvey Bodiford was the superintendent of both Harmon and Goose Bay US military schools with his main office at Goose Bay.

In 1961 Cecil Haddox was promoted to superintendent of schools at Ernest Harmon AFB and he was also appointed principal of the junior-senior high schools. Mr. Haddox had previously taught at Pepperrell AFB from 1957 to 1960 before being transferred to Harmon that year. In 1961 several new programs were started due to his perseverance and the National Honor Society was formed as well as several new classes such as art, music and physical education.

The base's civilian dependent population continued to grow during the early 1960s and the schools expanded along with them. A new high school (now being used by Newfoundland and Labrador's community college, the College of the North Atlantic) was opened and in 1962–63, the high school teaching staff increased to 25 while the elementary-middle school staff of teachers jumped to 42.

By 1965–66, the last year of military operations at Ernest Harmon AFB, the total school population had now grown to over 1000 elementary students and 38 teachers and the high school had a population of 171 junior high and 235 high school students with 28 teachers. When the base closed in 1966, so did the school system, which had 1,175 elementary students and 43 teachers and 405 junior and high school students and 26 teachers upon closure.

Extra curricular activities

Staff Sergeant Jack Prekup formed the first Boy Scout troop on the base and had many priority events because of the "brass" liking Scouting. Scouting was quite active in the elementary and high school levels. Trips were made to Corner Brook, Fox Lake, Indian Head, the Port au Port Peninsula, Kippens, the Humber River to fish for Atlantic salmon, and other locations. Boy Scouts became Lone Scouts after leaving the base if they so desired, in other communities. Ed Zeidler and Sergeant Henry Erben were the last Scoutmasters. Sergeant Erben was the Troop 6 survival trainer and had worked with the first seven US astronauts in survival techniques.

Recreation

Stephenville Air Base and later Ernest Harmon AFB was quite an isolated posting during its early years as a United States Army Air Forces and later United States Air Force base. It was located in the protection of the Long Range Mountains and harbour of the St. Georges Bay area, virtually cut off from rest of the island, except for a few roads and boat and plane traffic. Newfoundland itself was, and still is, considered isolated. But during the 1940s and 1950s, when roads were virtually non-existent and surface travel was limited to the slow narrow-gauge passenger trains of the Newfoundland Railway which linked to small coastal steamships or ferries to the mainland at North Sydney, Nova Scotia, the sense of isolation could prove overwhelming. In addition, the airfield's location at the head of Bay St. George was one of the more geographically isolated parts of the island, being surrounded by the Long Range Mountains and the coastline of the island's west coast being dotted with tiny outports. In addition to USAAF/USAF aircraft, the only other option for travel was the railway and ferries/coasters, or exploring the limited local road network which stretched along the coast and into the uninhabited interior of the island.

Despite its early isolation, morale on the base was high. The base also precipitated an economic boom of sorts on Newfoundland's southwest coast during the 1940s. Corner Brook to the north had been considered the major population centre for the region, given its industrial base, harbour, and nearby recreational opportunities in the Humber Valley. With the investment of the USAAF in Stephenville, the St. George's Bay area began to flourish and grew rapidly. The village of Stephenville grew from a hamlet of several hundred people with no paved streets, side walks, water or sewage system in 1941 into a modern town of over 5,000 by the mid-1950s. By the time Ernest Harmon AFB closed in the mid-1960s, the town had more than doubled in size, partly as a result of the provincial government's forced resettlement policy toward residents of outports.

Recognizing the link between geographic and social isolation, the base command incorporated a number of recreational facilities into their programs and building projects, making Ernest Harmon AFB a leader of sorts among USAF facilities. By the mid-1950s, thousands of service men and their families were making use of these activities monthly. In the area of Hobby Shops there was space available for leather craft, ceramics, amateur radio, lapidary, woodworking, automotive shops, model airplanes and photo labs. Sports facilities and groups were set for softball, baseball, bowling, golf, picnicking, archery and guns. The Stephenville area was located near good hunting and fishing grounds, thus the base established a fishing lodge at Camp 33 with eight large cabins, a 40-man bunk house, along with a mess hall and kitchen. Camp 33 was owned by the Bowater Pulp and Paper Company which had a mill in Corner Brook, although the camp was leased to the base during the spring and summer months.

Along with outside activities a number of service clubs were built and the University of Maryland University College extension courses were set up for those wishing to continue their education while on the base. A local broadcasting station and commercial free radio station was in operation by the mid-1950s with as many as six live shows a week being broadcast as well as live theater and plays being made available and a movie theater. A large gymnasium was built in 1956 with a seating capacity of 500, two squash courts and four wall courts. The base chapel accommodated up to 1500 worshippers of many religions and faiths per week. The library was also one of the most frequently used facilities with an average book lending rate of 1000 books every month. The most popular recreational feature of the entire base was the Base Theater which ran a new movie every night except Sundays and Mondays. There were four shows a day and a matinee on Saturdays.

Given its size and importance, and the large number of personnel assigned during the height of the Cold War in the 1950s, the base managed to attract many celebrities to visit and/or perform, including Marilyn Monroe, Elvis Presley, Frank Sinatra and Bob Hope. In the early years of the base, recreational activities off base in the town of Stephenville were very limited and some were often restricted. In some of the pamphlets released by the base to its airmen, they went as far as giving the names of women and particular houses and taverns that no base personnel were to be in or near, as well as rules about fraternizing with the local girls.

Base entrepreneurship and controversy

The Hanson Memorial Highway bypass project resulted in what has been referred to as the "Fight for Long Gull Pond". During the bypass road construction activities of 1953–54 the 347th Engineer Aviation Battalion used the beach area of Long Gull Pond as a storage yard for their equipment while they were building the road. The bypass road or Hanson Memorial Highway as it was later to be called, ran along the same route as the  narrow gauge branch rail line from the base to the Newfoundland Railway main line at White's Siding, east of Stephenville Crossing.

In June 1953 one of the officers overseeing construction, Captain Claxton Ray, took it upon himself to discover the ownership of a tract of land encircling the head of the lake nearest the rail line. It was listed on their maps as being part of Reid Lot 21.

The only means of access to Long Gull Pond was by the military rail line from Ernest Harmon AFB to White's Siding, or by walking for  through the rugged terrain. The construction of the bypass road continued through the summer of 1955 and there still was no evidence of the ownership history behind Reid Lot 21. The engineers had been dealing with the woods manager at Bowater's Pulp & Paper Limited, Mr Cyril Parsons, concerning land acquisition rights along the right of way of the bypass road. Major Ray (since promoted) was informed that Bowater owned the parcel of land in question and that they would entertain the idea of selling it for two purposes only: agriculture or tourist development.

On July 19, 1955, an application to purchase the  site was considered by Bowater and they informed the US military that the sale had been approved with one clause added "...you will be required to resell to the company the land which you are now acquiring at its original purchase price [$20 per acre (4,900/km²)] together with the cost of any improvements which you may have made, should you desire to sell the property within a period of ten years".

In 1956 Major Ray made preparations to be relieved from active duty with the engineers as of April 30. He returned to Stephenville as a civilian wishing to engage in private enterprise and drew up plans for a tourist development on the Long Gull Pond site. Bowater leased  of surrounding land for the recreation venture, reserving the timber rights for themselves. Because the road construction was incomplete at this time and winter was setting in, the actual purchase transaction did not take place until May 16, 1957. The bypass road was still under construction and was not completed until the fall with opening ceremonies taking place in October.

During the summer of 1957, rumors were abounding in the town of Stephenville that an American had purchased property with a great potential to the area. The Western Star in Corner Brook had printed a report on a chamber of commerce meeting where it was proposed that since Stephenville had used the Long Gull Pond site for a park for many years, that it should be acquired for recreational purposes under the Provincial Parks Act before individuals gobbled it up for their own profits. Bowater was placed in an embarrassing position: they had sold Canadian land to a foreigner, before the local population realized they had lost a valuable piece of property.

Major Ray realized that Stephenville had neither the funds nor the coordinated efforts required to construct a park in the Long Gull Pond area. Stephenville had over $40,000 in water and sewage bills due at the time and these had not been collected. The town (outside the base) had only one paved street and the others were inadequately lighted, snow removal was inadequate during the winter, there was no water filtration plant at this time and the only local police force was a local Royal Canadian Mounted Police (RCMP) detachment. With all this in mind, Major Ray made an announcement in The Western Star (reference cited) on August 20, 1958:

"I find it most strange that the Stephenville Town Council is seeking to acquire control of my property along Long Gull Pond, off Hansen Memorial Highway, in order to operate a public park several miles from its legal boundaries. In recent months the Council and the Department of Mines and Resources, has requested me to sell my property to establish a so called 'provincial town park'. In each of the three letters offering to buy the property a ridiculously low price is used. The only organizations which have publicly declared themselves are the Town Council and the Stephenville Lions Club.

"It is most difficult to understand why I am being victimized, and current activities have every mark of an organized group attempting to overthrow the rights of an individual.... After I had recognized the value of the property, and spent over a year developing it, clearing building sites, fencing it, then and only then, did others come forward and attempt to acquire it. If a town park is needed miles from the center of Stephenville, why did the council wait so long?

"I am convinced, and sources of other people agree with me that a tourist resort will be of far more benefit to the St. Georges- Port au Port districts than a public park operated by a town council whose reputation as able administrators must obviously be in doubt when it acknowledges tax arrears of $40,000 or more....

"At the best of times an individual is hard pressed to maintain his rights in the face of constituted authority, no matter how honest or sincere such an authority is in its actions. It is for this reason that we have laws to protect individuals and minority groups. My position is even more vulnerable to attack since I am an American-born citizen who is seeking a new career in Canada as a Canadian Immigrant. I can still be called a foreigner although I have permanent establishments, business and property investments in Newfoundland.

"Three organizations are involved in trying to force me off land I legally own — Stephenville Town Council: Stephenville Chamber of Commerce: and Stephenville Lions Club. It was the Chamber of Commerce in 1957 that called for the setting up of a civic park at Long Gull Pond. It is a whisper campaign, to make people believe I am standing in the way of progress, that I am stubbornly refusing to sell my land thus robbing the people of the west coast their own born-right to boil the kettle on their chosen spot of summer scenery. This argument is full of holes. Firstly, I have stated publicly that a first rate section of my land including frontage along the beach of the pond has been reserved and placed solely at the disposal of all comers without cost. I have offered to make such an arrangement permanent by entering into a proper contract with the appropriate authority. This fact, plus the fact that land is still available elsewhere on the pond, shows that more than just a park is involved."I have spent thousands of dollars on plans, clearing, materials and construction of a tourist resort under the regulations of the Newfoundland Tourist Development Board in order to provide a much needed attraction for this area. Clearly, It should be supported by the general public who should see that the individual does not suffer in false progress."

In the Fall of 1958, Mr. W.J. Keough, Minister of Mines and Resources stated that there was no chance, at the present time for the provincial or municipal governments to purchase any property near Stephenville for a park. The Indian Head Rod and Gun Club went ahead that same year with construction of buildings on property bordering Major Ray's, which they had leased from Bowater.

The controversy died after Major Ray didn't develop the Bowater-leased property on the lake as a resort, instead allowing public access to the property until it was sold to the Indian Head Rod and Gun Club in 1987. Ray had turned his efforts to other ventures and in August 1953 he had received permission from the United States and Canadian governments and the town of Stephenville to construct and operate a trailer park as off-base housing for Ernest Harmon AFB servicemen. Mr White bought the property in 1965 for $20,000. In 1956, Ray began the first coin-operated laundromat and dry cleaners in Newfoundland (one of only five in Canada at the time), as well as a flower shop. He lived on the base until 1965 and raised a family with his wife, Gay, a teacher at the Harmon Elementary School.

See also

 Eastern Air Defense Force (Air Defense Command)

References

 Chambers, John Rutgers University 1989 Introduction to original manuscript
 
 
 
 
 
 
 
 
 
 
 
 
 
 
 
 
 
 

Archives information
Records in possession of one of the editors of this article, pertaining to: Lt. Colonel Claxton Ray (1916–1989) are now located in the Centre for Newfoundland Studies archives at Memorial University, St. John's, Newfoundland. A microfilm reel is available with all the archival material mentioned.

These records contain information pertaining to the following: Clay County Alabama (Ashland, Lineville and environs): where he was born, raised, attended high school, married and raised a family. Georgia Tech: where he attended before entering the United States Army. Reverend and Mrs. S.C. Ray of Clay County Alabama: Manuscripts and correspondence related to his book: Some Thoughts on the Bible as the Word of God''.

Letters. World War II records: 360th Engineers, 1053rd Port Construction & Repair, personal correspondence, diaries and manuscripts. Korean War records: 809th Engineer Aviation Battalion. Ernest Harmon Air Force Base, Stephenville Newfoundland: 1953–1965. 347th/823rd Engineer Aviation Battalion. Military, business, educational and personal records. Additional records are kept at the Scott Library Archives, York University, North York, Ontario as part of my archival collection. Woodstock: 1965–1989. Correspondence and records pertaining to family and business.

External links

 Town of Stephenville
 History of the Ernest Harmon Air Force Base - Town of Stephenville
 Ernest Harmon Air Force Base at Newfoundland and Labrador Heritage

Destroyers for Bases Agreement airfields
Installations of the United States Air Force in Canada
Defunct airports in Newfoundland and Labrador
Airports established in 1941
Airfields of the United States Army Air Forces Air Transport Command on the North Atlantic Route
World War II airfields in Canada
Airfields of the United States Army Air Forces in Canada
Military installations closed in 1966
Military installations in Newfoundland and Labrador
Military airbases in Newfoundland and Labrador
1941 establishments in Newfoundland
1966 disestablishments in Newfoundland and Labrador